The 2006 International GT Open season was the inaugural season of the International GT Open, the grand tourer-style sports car racing founded  by the Spanish GT Sport Organización. It began on 1 April at Autodromo Nazionale Monza and finished on 12 November, at Barcelona after five double-header meetings with one single race round.

Overall championship and GTA class was won by Playteam SaraFree driver Michele Bartyan, while GTB class title was clinched by Fabrizio Gini and GTS class by Andrea Belicchi and Stefano Zonca.

Race calendar and results

References

External links
 

International GT Open
International GT Open seasons